Nyköping Municipality in Sweden held a municipal election on 18 September 1994. The election was part of the local elections and held on the same day as the general election.

Results
The number of seats remained at 61 with the Social Democrats winning the most at 34, a gain of eight from 1991, thus gaining an overall majority with around 53% of the vote. The number of valid ballots cast were 32,367.

By constituency

Urban and rural vote

Percentage points

By votes

Electoral wards

Nyköping

Rural areas

References

Nyköping municipal elections
Nyköping